Dyschirius fleischeri is a species of ground beetle in the subfamily Scaritinae. It was described by Deville in 1904.

References

fleischeri
Beetles described in 1904